Leeds city centre is the central business district of Leeds, West Yorkshire, England. It is roughly bounded by the Inner Ring Road to the north and the River Aire to the south and can be divided into several quarters.

Central districts

Arena Quarter

The Arena Quarter is a mixed-use area best known for being the home of the First Direct Arena.

Its location is directly north of Merrion Street. The Inner Ring Road borders the district on both the east and north boundary, with Woodhouse Lane acting as the district's western boundary. It is mainly made up of high-rise residential properties and developments, including Sky Plaza and Opal 3. Altus House is the tallest building in Yorkshire. Other major institutions are located within the Quarter, including the Yorkshire Bank HQ and also the Merrion Centre. Queen Square is also found here.

The Calls

The Calls is close to the River Aire. It is directly south of the Retail Quarter and to the west of Crown Point Road. The area's decline began in the early 20th century when industry moved away from the centre out towards Hunslet, Holbeck, Armley and Kirkstall.  From 1985 to 1995 Leeds Corporation carried out a major regeneration with a careful conversion of listed building warehouses and new build in sympathetic style for a mixed-use area.

Many of the area's old industrial buildings have now been converted into modern flats and commercial buildings. The western part of the area is centred on Lower Briggate, where Leeds' LGBT nightlife is focused.

Civic Quarter

The Civic Quarter is the area roughly north-west of The Headrow and west of the Arena Quarter. It is home to a number of grand Victorian buildings that are important in the civic life of the city. Prominent landmarks include Leeds Magistrates' and Crown Courts, the City Library, City Art Gallery and Leeds Town Hall, which was completed in 1858 and opened by Queen Victoria. The city's largest hospital, the Leeds General Infirmary, has been operating here since 1869.

Behind Leeds Town Hall are Millennium Square and Leeds Civic Hall. Millennium Square was a flagship project to mark the year 2000 and hosts regular concerts, with past performers including the Kaiser Chiefs, Bridewell Taxis, HARD-Fi, Fall Out Boy and Embrace. Leeds Civic Hall was opened in 1933 by King George V and is home to the Lord Mayor's Room and the council chambers. Many barristers' chambers and solicitors' offices are found here because of the close proximity to the courts. Also nearby are Leeds Metropolitan University, the University of Leeds, Leeds College of Art and the Park Lane and Technology campuses of Leeds City College.

Cultural Quarter

The Cultural Quarter is in the east of the city centre on Quarry Hill. Landmarks here include the BBC building, which moved from Woodhouse Lane in August 2004; the Leeds Playhouse, which opened in March 1990; Leeds College of Music, which moved to its current location in 1997; and Northern Ballet which moved to the area in 2010. Leeds City College also has a large campus here.

Leeds Dock also lies to the south of the Cultural Quarter and is where the Royal Armouries Museum can be found. The building, designed by architect Derek Walker, was built at a cost of £42.5 million and completed in two years, and has since become one of the city's major tourist attractions

Financial Quarter

The Financial Quarter is bounded by Park Row to the East, Leeds Inner Ring Road to the west, The Headrow to the north and Wellington Street to the south. It is centred on the Georgian Park Square, one of the green spaces in Leeds city centre. The City Centre Loop passes through the quarter, using City Square, Quebec Street, King Street and East Parade. Leeds Law School is at Cloth Hall Court. Major names can be found in the financial quarter such as Aviva and The Bank of England.

The district has grown out towards the west of the city. The Wellington Place development and the wider Wellington Gardens area of the city contain a number of international corporations. Wellington Place is currently under construction.

Holbeck Urban Village

Historically, Holbeck Urban Village was Holbeck's closest area to the centre of Leeds. Due to the expansion of the city, it is now considered part of the city centre and was rezoned as Holbeck Urban Village, following the completion of a number of developments. is the name given by local government and planning agencies to a mixed-use urban renewal area south of Leeds railway station.

Bridgewater Place and also Granary Wharf are within Holbeck Urban Village. The new High Speed 2 station will border this area of Leeds, which is why much of the area is considered prime location for development.

Shopping Quarter

The Shopping Quarter, extends south from the Headrow and includes Leeds' major shopping locations. It is considered the retail core of Leeds, containing Corn Exchange, Leeds Kirkgate Market, Trinity Leeds and also both Victoria Gate and Victoria Quarter. Kirkgate and Briggate are the oldest streets in Leeds, from which the city grew. The Shopping Quarter can be subdivided into several areas including Victoria, a high-end shopping district home to one of the UK's only Harvey Nichols stores.

Development of the area has seen two new additional indoor malls, Victoria Gate and Trinity Leeds. 

Opened 21 March 2013, Trinity Leeds shopping centre had a surge of 130,000 people enter its doors on the first day of opening. Costing £350m, and creating 3,000 jobs, this was a major development for Leeds. It was the only major retail development to open in the UK in 2013. It covers 1,000,000 sq ft (92,900 sq m) with key anchor stores being Topman and M&S. Other stores in the centre include Apple, River Island, Next, Hollister, H&M, Primark, Everyman, Conran Restaurants and Mango. It has a capacity for 120 shops and numerous pop-up shops.

Victoria Gate's construction was completed in 2016 and won numerous awards as one of the best malls in the world. It houses the city centre's John Lewis department store, along with many other flagship stores of premium brands. Older parts of the Victorian District include department stores in Leeds which have historically included Lewis's, which became Allders in 1996 and latterly closed in 2005, Schofields which was taken over by House of Fraser in 1988 and closed in 1996, the Co-op which closed in the mid 1990s, Littlewoods which closed in the late 1990s and is now occupied by Zara and H&M, C&A which closed in 2001 and is currently occupied by Next Clearance (until demolition for construction of the Trinity Quarter) and Marshall & Snelgrove which became part of Debenhams and closed in the 1970s and lies of the site of Lloyds TSB on Park Row have disappeared but currently department stores include Debenhams (historically known as Matthias Robinson), Harvey Nichols (which when opened in 1996 became the first branch outside London), Marks and Spencer, BHS and House of Fraser (formerly a Woolworths, it temporarily became premises for Schofields and latterly became Rackhams before becoming House of Fraser in 1996).

Most streets in the District are connected to Briggate, one of the main shopping streets, home to several national and international food chains, like McDonald's, Burger King and Nando's, and international shopping chains, including Zara. Off Briggate are several of Leeds' famous shopping arcades, such as Thornton's Arcade and the Victoria Quarter. Briggate was fully pedestrianised in 1996 and connected the two previously pedestrian areas either side of it. Other shopping attractions include the Corn Exchange, Leeds Kirkgate Market, Granary Wharfe, Leeds Shopping Plaza, Headrow Shopping Centre, The Light, the St John's Centre, and Crown Point Retail park which lies half a mile away from the retail core.

Major corporations
Within the Financial Quarter
The Bank of England
Aviva
Zurich Financial Services
Leeds Building Society
Lloyds TSB

Elsewhere in the city centre
KPMG
Direct Line
Yorkshire Bank
Asda
Channel 4

Hospitality in the city centre
Queens Hotel
Malmaison Hotel
Radisson Blu Hotel
The Ivy
The Man Behind the Curtain
Miller and Carter

Outside of the city centre, First Direct have their headquarters at Stourton, while HBOS have major offices in Lovell Park.

Leeds Lights 

Each Christmas the streets of Leeds city centre are decorated with a variety of Christmas lights. The widely publicised ‘switch-on' ceremony is in early November, when a celebrity flicks the switch to illuminate the decorations at Victoria Gardens and usually attracts tens-of-thousands of people to the turning on ceremony. When Leeds Lights were first established in 1983, the switch on was held on the 4th Thursday of November, however it has since been brought forward. The illuminations are renowned as being the largest display in the United Kingdom, spanning over 13 miles of city centre streets and using over 2 million low energy light bulbs.

Leeds is notable for designing, manufacturing and maintaining its own Christmas Light motifs. Its workshop began as a place to provide people with disabilities some employment opportunities. Its workshop has had several locations, beginning in a temporary location near Chapeltown Road, then to the old disused Whitbread Brewery site at Kirkstall and from 1993 to the present Seacroft location. Leeds City Council was the only local authority to do this for some years but now a small number have followed Leeds Lights example in preparing their own displays where as most other councils buy in their lights and services. The lights are repaired and pressure cleaned annually at the Leeds Lights workshop in Seacroft throughout the year. 80,000 coloured lamps are stored at the workshop, and 2000m of coloured rope light are used. A team of 14 works all year round producing the display. From October–January, a team of 9 works to erect the lights ready for the switch on in early November, before removing the lights after Christmas.

Commercial advertising has been permitted on some of the lights, such as The Headrow's champagne bottle lights.

Celebrities who turned on the Leeds Christmas lights:

2018 – Josh Warrington
2017 – Danny McGuire and Rob Burrow
2016 – Claire Morris
2015 – Alex Peel 
2014 – Sam Bailey and G4
2013 – Gabriella Cilmi and The Vamps
2012 – Jonathan Brownlee
2011 – Matt Cardle
2010 – McFly, Shayne Ward (Miley Cyrus)
2009 – Pixie Lott (late replacement for Alexandra Burke), Mini Viva, Girls Can't Catch with guest appearances from Lorraine Kelly and members of LUFC and Leeds Rhinos.
2008 – Leon Jackson, Alesha Dixon, Simon Webbe and Same Difference.
2007 – Shayne Ward, Dick and Dom, Chico.
2006 – McFly (Gaynor Faye and Jane Tomlinson also appeared)
2005 – Rachel Stevens and the Lovebites with Nicki Chapman presenting.
2004 – Chris Moyles and Girls Aloud
2003 – Phill Jupitus
2002 – Ainsley Harriott
2001 – Vinnie Jones and Lucas Radebe
2000 – Mark Lamarr, Dave Benson-Phillips, Harry Kewell, Sheree Murphy and Billie Piper
1998 – Mel B and Les Dennis
1997 – Rolf Harris and Rod Hull & Emu
1996 – Dale Winton
1995 – Little and Large, Right Said Fred and PJ and Duncan
1994 – Paul Daniels
1993 – Noel Edmonds & Mr Blobby
1992 – Sonia
1989 – Melanie Hill
1986 – Native American Joe Sierra
1983 – Russ Abbot

Transport

Rail

Leeds city centre is served by Leeds railway station. The station is one of 20 in Great Britain to be managed by Network Rail. It is the busiest English station outside London, and the UK's second busiest station outside London after Glasgow Central. The station serves national, regional and suburban railway services.

Air
The city centre is served by Leeds Bradford Airport. This is situated in Yeadon approximately seven miles north -west of the city centre.  The city centre is linked to the airport by the A1 bus service operated by Yorkshire Coastliner. The airport serves major European destinations as well as many further afield.

Road
Traffic passing past Leeds city centre is diverted away from the main areas by the Leeds Inner Ring Road, an urban motorway passing the East, North and West of the city centre.  Much of the Inner Ring Road is in tunnels so not visible to passing pedestrians. All major routes into Leeds head towards the city centre. The city centre is served by the M621 motorway.

Buses
The most notable bus service within central Leeds is the LeedsCityBus service operated by First Leeds and funded by West Yorkshire Metro. This service runs every few minutes in a clockwise direction around the city centre. It serves major transport interchanges and both universities as well as the main shopping and financial districts. There have been calls for a second FreeCityBus to serve emerging business, leisure and residential districts in the southern part of central Leeds.

Leeds city centre has its main bus station in the east of the city.  However, as a rule only buses heading out of the City of Leeds and National Express services use it. Local First Leeds buses use stops on the city streets, or a number of smaller bus stations, referred to as bus points, at Bond Street, Infirmary Street, Leeds railway station and the Corn Exchange.

Location grid

References

Further reading
Burt S. and Grady K. (2002 – 2nd edition) The Illustrated History of Leeds, Breedon Books, Derby
Fraser D. (ed.) (1980) A History of Modern Leeds, Manchester University Press, Manchester
Unsworth R. and Stillwell J. (eds.) (2004) Twenty-First Century Leeds: Geographies of a Regional City, Leeds University Press, Leeds; Sixteen Chapters about the Contemporary City; 160 maps, many photos
Wrathmell S. (2005), Leeds, Pevsner Architectural Guides, Yale University Press, London

External links

'Leeds Initiative' Leeds Initiative city partnership.
Leeds City Council
'Leeds, Live it, Love it' Official city website, for visitors, business, students and residents.
Leeds Local History Wiki Add your memories of Leeds.

Places in Leeds
Central business districts in the United Kingdom